Louise Jane Miller-Frost ( Miller)  is an Australian politician elected to represent the division of Boothby in the 2022 Australian federal election. She is a member of the Australian Labor Party.

Early life 
Miller-Frost was born in Hollywood, Worcestershire, England, and was 18 months old when her family migrated to Adelaide in 1968. She attended Para Hills East Infant School and Primary School, The Heights High School, Banksia Park High School and Seymour College.

Her father died unexpectedly when she was thirteen years old.

Miller-Frost was the first in her family to attend university, completing an undergraduate Bachelor of Applied Science at the University of South Australia, then going on to complete a Master of Arts and Master of Business Administration at UNISA, and a Master of Public Health at Adelaide University.  She is a fellow of the Australian Institute of Company Directors.

Career
Miller-Frost has had an extensive career as an executive in a range of organisations including SA Health, City of Port Adelaide Enfield, and City of Burnside. In 2017 she became chief executive of Catherine House Inc, a women’s homelessness service. In her time at Catherine House, she oversaw the implementation of National Disability Insurance Scheme funding at the non-profit. On 10 March 2020, she became chief executive of St Vincent de Paul Society SA as the Covid-19 pandemic hit. In May 2021, the South Australian government under Steven Marshall changed its funding model for homeless accommodation providers, which resulted in the St Vincent de Paul Society SA losing funding. Miller-Frost was critical of the Marshall government's plans, and expressed a desire for more social housing in the state.

She has also sat on a number of boards, notably the Medical Board of Australia, Winston Churchill Memorial Trust, Animal Welfare League SA and as Chair of UnitingCare Wesley Bowden. She was also Co-Chair of the Adelaide Zero Project to end homelessness, and SA Co-Chair of Anti-Poverty Week in 2020 and 2021.

Politics
Miller-Frost was preselected by the Australian Labor Party to run for Parliament in the seat of Boothby in the 2022 federal election. Boothby had been held by the Liberal Party of Australia since 1949, but in the 2019 federal election the margin had only been 1.4%. Incumbent Nicolle Flint chose not to run for re-election, meaning Miller-Frost's main opponents were the moderate Rachel Swift from the Liberal Party, and independent candidate Jo Dyer. Miller-Frost won the election, with Dyer conceding defeat on the night of the election and Swift conceding the following day.  She is the 1,224th member of the House of Representatives, and the 14th Member for Boothby.

She was appointed to the following committees:

- Joint Statutory: Law Enforcement (28/7/2022)

- House of Representatives Standing: Social Policy and Legal Affairs (28/7/2022)

- House of Representatives Select: Workforce Australia Employment Services (3/8/2022)

- Chair of the Social Policy Committee of the Labor Caucus

- Co-Chair of Parliamentary Friends of Mutuals and Co-operatives

- Co-Chair of Parliamentary Friends of Women and Work

Political views 

Miller-Frost has expressed support for meaningful action on climate change, noting her frustration at the "lack of recognition of the dangers facing us as a result of climate change and also of the amazing economic opportunities" Australia could take advantage of. She also campaigned strongly on integrity in politics and in favour of a federal ICAC. She reflected on these issues, and her work in the poverty and homelessness sectors in her first speech.

Personal life 
Miller-Frost lives in Cumberland Park, South Australia, with her husband Kim Cheater. She has three sons, triplets who were born in 1999, and three stepsons.

References

External links 
 

Living people
1967 births
Members of the Australian House of Representatives for Boothby
21st-century Australian politicians
Members of the Australian House of Representatives
Australian Labor Party members of the Parliament of Australia
Women members of the Australian House of Representatives
21st-century Australian women politicians